Verona Airport  is a privately owned public use airport located one nautical mile (2 km) east of the central business district of Verona, a city in Dane County, Wisconsin, United States.

Facilities and aircraft 
Verona Airport covers an area of 15 acres (6 ha) at an elevation of 960 feet (293 m) above mean sea level. It has two runways with turf surfaces: 3/21 is 2,190 by 90 feet (668 x 27 m) and 4/22 is 1,897 by 85 feet (578 x 26 m).

For the 12-month period ending July 17, 2019, the airport had 1,010 aircraft operations, an average of 84 per month: 99% general aviation and 1% military. In January 2023, there were 3 aircraft based at this airport: 2 single-engine and 1 ultralight.

See also 
 List of airports in Wisconsin

References

External links 
 Verona Airport (W19) at Wisconsin DOT Airport Directory

Airports in Wisconsin
Transportation in Dane County, Wisconsin